Brian Gilmore (8 July 1933 – 29 November 1959) was an Australian rules footballer who played with Footscray in the Victorian Football League (VFL) during the 1950s.

Gilmore was a follower in Footscray's 1954 premiership side and had the honour of having the ball in his hands when the siren sounded. He also represented Victoria at interstate football.

He was killed in a car accident near Wangaratta, Victoria in 1959.

His grandson Daniel Gilmore played in the AFL for Fremantle.

References

External links

1933 births
1959 deaths
Australian rules footballers from Victoria (Australia)
Western Bulldogs players
Western Bulldogs Premiership players
Yarraville Football Club players
Road incident deaths in Victoria (Australia)
One-time VFL/AFL Premiership players